Hiroshi Shimomura (May 11, 1875 – December 9, 1957) was the fourth President of the Japanese Olympic Committee (1937–1942), he was a graduate of the University of Tokyo.

|-

|-

|-

References 
『官報』第1310号・付録、「辞令」1916年12月13日。
『官報』第5654号、「叙任及辞令」1945年11月15日。

1875 births
1957 deaths
Members of the Japanese Olympic Committee
University of Tokyo alumni
People from Wakayama Prefecture
Japanese educators
Government ministers of Japan